The Cacheu is a river of Guinea-Bissau also known as the Farim along its upper course. Its total length is about 257 km. One of its major tributaries is the Canjambari River.

Course
Its headwaters are near the northern border of the country, north of Contuboel and close to a bend of the Geba River. It runs west, by the town of Farim and close to Bigenè, and broadens into an estuary on whose south shore the town of Cacheu may be found. Elia Island is a fairly large island located on the right bank of the river close to its mouth. The island's western end lies east of the confluence with the Elia River with Ongueringao Island on the other bank.

The Cacheu is navigable to large (2,000-ton) ships for about 97 km in, and to smaller vessels much further; it was formerly an important route for commerce.

History
During the Portuguese Colonial War, the Guinea-Bissau War of Independence, the river served several military operations.

In 2000, a large part of the estuary of the river became part of the Cacheu River Natural Park.  68% of the park features mango trees, which forms a part of a large block of the trees in West Africa.

References

Bibliography

Salif Diop, La côte ouest-africaine. Du Saloum (Sénégal) à la Mellacorée (Rép. de Guinée), ORSTOM, Paris, 1990, 380 pages

Rivers of Guinea-Bissau
Geba River